Events in chess in 1987.

Events
 7 October – 19 December.  World champion Garry Kasparov defends his title against challenger Anatoly Karpov in the 1987 World Championship in Seville.  Kasparov was down 11–12 but won the 24th and final game of the match to tie and retain the title.
 The inaugural Australasian Masters chess tournament is won by Grandmaster Darryl Johansen.  This annual invitational event has been Australia's only round robin grandmaster event since 2013.

Births

 Ahmed Adly
 K. Jennitha Anto
 Dagur Arngrímsson
 Csaba Balogh
 Oluwafemi Balogun
 Tsegmediin Batchuluun
 Nino Batsiashvili
 Diego Di Berardino
 Daan Brandenburg
 Krzysztof Bulski
 J. Deepan Chakkravarthy
 Stanislav Cifka
 Karina Cyfka
 Anton Demchenko
 Nana Dzagnidze
 Viktor Erdős
 Maria Fominykh
 Leonid Gerzhoy
 Jessie Gilbert
 Olga Gutmakher
 Borislav Ivanov
 Fidel Corrales Jimenez
 Gawain Jones
 Eesha Karavade
 Muhammad Khusenkhojaev
 Erik Kislik
 Calvin Klaasen
 Humpy Koneru
 Baira Kovanova
 Martin Krämer
 Yerisbel Miranda Llanes
 Ruan Lufei
 Igor Lysyj
 Rodwell Makoto
 Karmen Mar
 Sandro Mareco
 Susanto Megaranto
 Georg Meier
 Salome Melia
 Luciana Morales Mendoza
 Cecile van der Merwe
 Batkhuyagiin Möngöntuul
 Hikaru Nakamura
 Phạm Lê Thảo Nguyên
 Arman Pashikian
 Sergey Pavlov
 Borki Predojević
 Antonio Radić
 Teimour Radjabov
 Vesna Rožič
 Anna Rudolf
 Veronika Schneider
 Samy Shoker
 Daniël Stellwagen
 Anđelija Stojanović
 Evgeny Tomashevsky
 Zehra Topel
 Hoàng Thị Bảo Trâm
 Sabrina Vega
 Ermes Espinosa Veloz
 Iva Videnova
 Nikita Vitiugov
 Radosław Wojtaszek
 Wang Yue
 Jolanta Zawadzka

Deaths

 Vladimir Alatortsev (14 May 1909 – 13 January 1987), Russian Grandmaster and chairman of the USSR Chess Federation from 1959–1961.
 Yakov Estrin (21 April 1923 – 2 February 1987), Russian International Master, International Correspondence Chess Grandmaster and International Correspondence Chess Federation World Champion, 1972–1976. 
 Narelle Kellner (18 October 1934 – 20 December 1987), Australian Woman International Master and two-time Australian Women's Champion (1972 and 1974).
 Józsa Lángos (28 August 1911 – 17 May 1987), Hungarian Woman International Master and eight-time winner of the Hungarian Women's Chess Championship (1942, 1943, 1944, 1947, 1949, 1950, 1951, 1952).
 Zsuzsa Makai (3 September 1945 – 12 May 1987), Hungarian and Romanian Woman International Master, two-time Olympian (1969 and 1978) and Hungarian Women's Champion (1980).
 Stepan Popel (15 August 1909 – 27 December 1987), Ukrainian and American chess player.
 Ignatz von Popiel (27 July 1863 – 2 May 1941), Polish-Ukrainian chess player.
 Salme Rootare (26 March 1913 – 21 October 1987), Estonian Woman International Master and fifteen-time Estonian Women's Champion (1945, 1948, 1949, 1950, 1954, 1956, 1957, 1960, 1962, 1964, 1966, 1969, 1970, 1971, and 1972).
 Boris Rõtov (20 August 1937 – 10 September 1987), Russian-Estonian chess player and 1978 Estonian Champion.
 George Wheatcroft (29 October 1905 – 2 December 1987), English chess player, winner of the 1935 British Correspondence Chess Championship and President of the British Chess Federation from 1953 to 1956.
 Mikhail Yudovich (8 June 1911 – 19 September 1987), Russian International Master, Grandmaster of Correspondence Chess, and chess writer. 

 
20th century in chess
Chess by year